Eino Valle (18 February 1932 – 21 June 1990) was a Finnish long-distance runner. He competed in the marathon at the 1964 Summer Olympics.

References

External links
 

1932 births
1990 deaths
Athletes (track and field) at the 1964 Summer Olympics
Finnish male long-distance runners
Finnish male marathon runners
Olympic athletes of Finland
People from Ruokolahti
People from Lauritsala
Sportspeople from South Karelia